The Cyclone Kid is a 1942 American Western film directed by George Sherman and written by Richard Murphy. The film stars Don "Red" Barry, John James, Lynn Merrick, Alex Callam, Joel Friedkin and Slim Andrews. The film was released on May 31, 1942, by Republic Pictures.

Plot

Cast 
Don "Red" Barry as Johnny Dawson aka Cyclone Kid
John James as Doctor Bill Dawson
Lynn Merrick as Mary Phillips
Alex Callam as Big Jim Johnson
Joel Friedkin as Judge Phillips
Slim Andrews as Arkansas Slim 
Rex Lease as Henchman Ben Rankin
Joe McGuinn as Henchman Ames
Monte Montague as Sheriff
Frank LaRue as Marshal Jack

References

External links 
 

1942 films
1940s English-language films
American Western (genre) films
1942 Western (genre) films
Republic Pictures films
Films directed by George Sherman
American black-and-white films
1940s American films